Delegated Path Validation (DPV) is a method for offloading to a trusted server the work involved in validating a public key certificate.

Combining certificate information supplied by the DPV client with certificate path and revocation status information obtained by itself, a DPV server is able to apply complex validation policies that are prohibitive for each client to perform. 

The requirements for DPV are described in RFC 3379.

See also 
 Delegated Path Discovery

Cryptographic protocols